Thomaz Bellucci was the defender of championship title, but he chose to not participate this year.
Gastón Gaudio won in the final 6–2, 1–6, 6–3, against Frederico Gil.

Seeds

Draw

Final four

Top half

Bottom half

External Links
Main Draw
Qualifying Draw

Tunis Open
2009 Singles